Ceber  is a village in the administrative district of Gmina Kotla, within Głogów County, Lower Silesian Voivodeship, in south-western Poland.

The village has a population of 150.

References

Ceber